Melgven is a commune in the Finistère department of Brittany in northwestern France.

Geography

Climate
Melgven has a oceanic climate (Köppen climate classification Cfb).

Population
Inhabitants of Melgven are called Melgvinois in French.

Sights
 A gothic church from the 14th century at the center of the village
Chapelle de Bonne Nouvelle dedicated to notre Dame de Bonne Nouvelle
Chapelle de la Trinité built at the 16th century by the atelier de Saint Herbot

Gallery

See also
Communes of the Finistère department

References

External links

Official website 

Twinning
Interstate Committee of Melgven
Mayors of Finistère Association 

Communes of Finistère